Kushinagar is a district of the state of Uttar Pradesh in India situated in the easternmost part of the state. It has the administrative headquarters at Ravindra Nagar Dhoos. The district is named such after the town Kushinagar, a Buddhist pilgrimage site where Gautama Buddha attained parinirvana in the 5th century BCE. Since the independence of India, Kushinagar district was a part of Deoria District and came into existence on 13 May 1994 as a separate district division. It was earlier known as Padrauna and thereafter was renamed Kushinagar on 19 June 1997.

Location
Kushinagar District is bounded on the northeast by West Champaran and Gopalganj districts of Bihar, on the south by Deoria District and on the west by Gorakhpur and Maharajganj districts. It is part of Gorakhpur Division.

Economy
In 2006 the Ministry of Panchayati Raj named Kushinagar one of the country's 250 most backward districts (out of a total of 640). It is one of the 34 districts in Uttar Pradesh currently receiving funds from the Backward Regions Grant Fund Programme (BRGF).

Transport
The Indian Government has approved a project for the construction of an International Airport which would be completed till 2019. In 2017, Uttar Pradesh Government has approved a project for develop Kushinagar bus station as an International Bus Station. Daily Buses from Gorakhpur to Tamkuhi Road and Gorakhpur to Padrauna through Kasia are available at Railway Station Bus Depot Gorakhpur.

Padrauna, Ramkola, Kaptanganj, Dudahi and Tamkuhi Road are some cities connected with train facility in the district.

On 20th October 2021 the international airport was officially inaugurated during the Abhidhamma Day celebrations in Kushinagar.

Demographics

According to the 2011 census Kushinagar district has a population of 3,564,544, roughly equal to the nation of Lithuania or the US state of Connecticut. This gives it a ranking of 81st in India (out of a total of 640). Its population growth rate over the decade 2001-2011 was 23.08%. Kushinagar has a sex ratio of 955 females for every 1000 males, and a literacy rate of 67.66%. Scheduled Castes and Scheduled Tribes made up 15.27% and 2.25% of the population respectively.

According to 2011 Census, 77.67% of the population in the district spoke Bhojpuri and 21.79% Hindi as their first language.

Bhojpuri is the local language of Kushinagar. The Bhojpuri variant of Kaithi is the indigenous script of Bhojpuri language.

References

External links

 

 
Districts of Uttar Pradesh